The 2004–05 season was the 94th season in the existence of Cádiz CF and the club's second consecutive season in the second division of Spanish football. In addition to the domestic league, Cádiz participated in this season's edition of the Copa del Rey. The season covered the period from 1 July 2004 to 30 June 2005.

Friendlies

Competitions

Overview

Segunda División

League table

Results summary

Results by round

Matches

Source:

Copa del Rey

Statistics

Goalscorers

References

Cádiz CF seasons
Cádiz